The Ferrovie dello Stato Italiane (FS; Italian State Railways) Class 940 (Italian: Gruppo 940) is a 2-8-2 steam tank locomotive, derived from the Class 740 tender locomotive.

Design
The Class 940 was designed for the Apennine mountains railways, and especially for the Rome-Sulmona-Pescara line, an important coast-to-coast railway that presented steep gradients (up to 2.7%); until then those had been served by 0-6-0 locomotives such as the FS Class 851, that had become inadequate for the increasing needs. Therefore, it was decided to build a locomotive with eight driving wheels, by adapting the frames, the boiler and the engine of the Class 740 to a tank design, also adding a trailing wheel to the wheelbase to enable the new design to run well backwards as well as forwards.

The locomotives were built from 1922 to 1924 by the Officine Meccaniche, Reggiane and the Officine Meccaniche e Navali di Napoli, for a total of 50.

Service and modifications
Initially, most of the class was allocated to the Sulmona shed for service on the trans-apennine railway; after World War II (in which four locomotives ended up remaining in Yugoslavian territory, and being taken up by the Yugoslav Railways as JŽ 118 001-4), the Class was dispersed in many sheds throughout Italy. Since 1968 improved draughting and a larger chimney were fitted.

The Class 940 was a successful design, that remained in service till the end of regular steam services on the FS network, mostly for freight service but also for passenger trains and heavy shunting duties.

Preservation
Eighteen Class 940 survived into preservation; currently, only the 041 and the 006 are operational and available for heritage trains, while others (such as the 022 and the 036) are undergoing maintenance.

References

 
 

2-8-2T locomotives
940
Reggiane locomotives
Railway locomotives introduced in 1922
Standard gauge locomotives of Italy
Freight locomotives